Emily Maractho also known as Maractho Emily Comfort is the Lecturer of Journalism and Media Studies at Uganda Christian University. She was awarded the Next Generation Social Sciences in Africa: Doctoral Dissertation Research Fellowship 2015 to study Development Studies at the University of KwaZulu Natal on Media, women and public life in Uganda: Interrogating representation, interaction and engagement. She leads faculty of journalism, Media and Communication at the university with a new department of journalism and media studies Department. In 2018, she replaced Prof. Monica B. Chibita, who became the  first Dean of the faculty.

Career 
She gave an insight of Fake news in Journalism being intentional which is increasing pressure on fact-based media, creation of a lot of confusion which creates  distrust of news as a subject. She is the Vice chairperson of UWMA. During her panel discussion in 2019, she urged the need for media houses to do more mentoring of interns and to create a more peaceful environment for them to be encouraged to stay on after training. She said the media has a critical role in mentoring the young journalists which the academia have a role to play skilling them by investing in technology and human resource to create a befitting atmosphere for young journalists.

Academic Authorship 
She has also carried out substantial amount of research most of which has been published in reputable communication and journalism journals. below is a list of some of her research;

 Determinants of participation in political communication in Uganda’s broadcast media: implications for women. This study sought to establish why there is limited partaking of women in political communication and was conducted by case study and content analysis designs.
 Broadcasting governance and development in ‘Museveni's Uganda’. The study examined the governance and development of media in ‘Museveni's Uganda’ (1986- ) with specific reference to broadcasting.
 (Re)producing cultural narratives on women in public affairs programmes in Uganda. This article examined how mass media reproduce cultural narratives that affect women in Uganda. This is part of a larger study on representation, interaction and engagement of women and broadcast media in Uganda.
 Mass media, women and public life in Uganda : interrogating representation, interaction and engagement. This study interrogated women’s media participation through representation, interaction and engagement as components of conjunctural factors that are relevant to facilitating women’s participation in public life.
 Local Governments and Primary Education in Uganda. This study sought to find out what explains the difference in local governments’ performance across two districts that were given similar powers and share a similar history.
 The framing of COVID-19 in Uganda’s New Vision and Daily Monitor newspapers. This is a book chapter that analysed the coverage of the pandemic through the lens of framing theory. The chapter presents a content analysis of selected published material from their online sites in the two newspapers between 10 March and 2 June 2020.
 Elections and the media in post-conflict Africa: Votes and voices for peace?.
 Popular Participation in the Integration of the East African Community: Eastafricanness and Eastafricanization
 Camera, commerce & conscience: Afrowood and the crisis of purpose
 Uganda citizens' sovereignty and the EAC Nexus.

See also 
 Uganda Christian University
 Monica Chibita
 John Senyonyi
 University of KwaZulu-Natal

References

External links 
 Website of Uganda Christian University
 The economics of transport, energy
http://iks.ukzn.ac.za/taxonomy/term/446
Broadcasting governance and development in ‘Museveni's Uganda.
Website of Worlds of Journalism
(Re)producing cultural narratives on women in public affairs programmes in Uganda

Ugandan women academics
Ugandan journalists
Uganda Christian University alumni
Academic staff of Uganda Christian University
Ugandan women journalists
Living people
Year of birth missing (living people)